Borisav Burmaz (born 21 April 2001) is a Serbian footballer who plays for Serbian club Voždovac.

Career statistics

Club

Notes

References

2001 births
Living people
Serbian footballers
Serbia youth international footballers
Association football forwards
Serbian First League players
Serbian SuperLiga players
Red Star Belgrade footballers
RFK Grafičar Beograd players
FK Radnički 1923 players